Illinois Route 96 (IL 96) is a  north–south state highway in far western Illinois. It runs from IL 100 in Kampsville, not far from a ferry crossing across the Illinois River, to IL 94 north of Terre Haute.

Route description 

Illinois 96 follows much of the Great River Road in Illinois north from Kampsville, where it runs west to the Mississippi River and then turns north, passing U.S. Route 54 at a rural intersection and Interstate 72 at an old terminus near Kinderhook. It overlaps Illinois Route 106 west of Kinderhook and then runs parallel to Illinois Route 57 into Quincy. Within Quincy it follows 36th Street, State Street and 24th Street before overlapping briefly with U.S. Route 24. It also overlaps U.S. Route 136 in Hamilton, IL (across from Keokuk, Iowa) and Illinois Route 9 from Niota to Dallas City, Illinois.  Between Hamilton and Dallas City, Illinois 96 also passes through historic Nauvoo along Durphy and Mulholland Streets, two major streets that intersect in the middle of the town.

History 

SBI Route 96 originally followed the modern-day Illinois 96 from Niota south to Kinderhook. In 1941, the state announced that IL 96 was extended north through Dallas City and Lomax to Terre Haute.  Various state route designations (IL 96A) were used for Carmen Road between Lomax and Gulfport until the 1965 Mississippi River floods.  In March 1941, IL 96 was extended south to Hamburg to a historical ferry crossing. The Hamburg ferry stopped running in 1960. In 1950, Illinois 96 was rerouted into Kampsville, where another ferry crossing is located nearby on Illinois Route 108.

Major intersections

References

External links

096
096
Transportation in Calhoun County, Illinois
Transportation in Adams County, Illinois
Transportation in Pike County, Illinois
Transportation in Hancock County, Illinois
Transportation in Henderson County, Illinois